Joseph Hornby Birley  (12 March 1827 – 5 October 1881) was an English first-class cricketer.

The son of Hugh Hornby Birley and Cicely Hornby, he was born at Manchester in March 1827. He was educated at Winchester College, after which he became a merchant at Newton-le-Willows, Lancashire. He made a single appearance in first-class cricket for Manchester against Sheffield at Hyde Park in 1852. Batting twice in the match, he was dismissed for a single run in Manchester's first-innings by Henry Wright, while in their second-innings he was run out for 14. Birley later became a justice of the peace and he died at Newton-le-Willows in October 1881.

References

External links

1827 births
1881 deaths
Joseph
Cricketers from Manchester
People educated at Winchester College
English cricketers
Manchester Cricket Club cricketers
English merchants
English justices of the peace
19th-century English businesspeople